Pete Ohs is an American filmmaker. He is known for writing & directing the feature films Jethica (2022) and Everything Beautiful is Far Away (2017) as well as directing music videos for Best Coast, Wavves, Slow Club, and The Fiery Furnaces.

Personal life
Ohs was born and raised in Ohio.

Career
Ohs directed the No Hope Kids music video for Wavves which was included in Pitchfork's Top Music Videos of 2009 and the When I'm With You  music video for  Best Coast which was included in Pitchfork's Top Music Videos of 2010 as well as NME's Top 50 Videos of the Year.

In 2012, the hybrid-documentary feature I Send You This Place premiered at the Full Frame Documentary Film Festival. The film was co-directed with contemporary artist Andrea Sisson.

He was named one of Filmmaker Magazine'''s "25 New Faces of Independent Film" for 2013.

In 2013, his screenplay for Everything Beautiful is Far Away was selected for IFP's Emerging Storytellers program. In 2017, Everything Beautiful is Far Away had its world premiere at the Los Angeles Film Festival and received the U.S. Fiction Cinematography Award. The film stars Julia Garner & Joseph Cross with an original score by Alan Palomo.

In 2018, Ohs directed the short film Nothing Bad Will Happen starring Dasha Nekrasova.

In 2022, Ohs produced and directed the feature film Jethica'' starring Callie Hernandez and Will Madden. The film premiered at the 2022 SXSW Film Festival.

Filmography

Film

Music videos

References

External links
 

American film directors
American cinematographers
American male screenwriters
People from Ohio